The 1971 Barnet Council election took place on 13 May 1971 to elect members of Barnet London Borough Council in London, England. The whole council was up for election and the Conservative party stayed in overall control of the council. There were 43 Conservative councillors and 17 Labour, and also 5 aldermen, all Conservative.

Election result
Overall turnout in the election was 36.8%.

|}

Ward results

Arkley

Brunswick Park

Burnt Oak

Childs Hill

Colindale

East Barnet

East Finchley

Edgware

Finchley

Friern Barnet

Garden Suburb

Golders Green

Hadley

Hale

Hendon

Mill Hill

St Paul’s

Totteridge

West Hendon

Woodhouse

By-elections between 1971 and 1974

East Finchley

References

1971
1971 London Borough council elections